Dariusz Doliński (born 1959) - Polish psychologist. 

He is a lecturer at Szkoła Wyższa Psychologii Społecznej (SWPS), and he is the dean of its branch campus in Wrocław since March 2004. He received the grade of professor, as he worked as a scientific worker of The Institute of Psychology at the University of Opole. 

He specialises in the psychology of social behaviour (mechanisms of falling under the external influence and social manipulation), in emotional psychology and motivation also in the genesis of stereotypes. He is an author of over 150 publications. He is the editor-in-chief of Polish Psychological Bulletin,  reviewer of European Journal of Social Psychology and Journal of Personality and Social Psychology, and a president of the Psychological Sciences Committee in the Polish Science Academy.

External links
 SWPS official site

1959 births
Living people
Polish psychologists
Academic staff of SWPS University